Hubert Hüring (born 27 May 1950) is a German former professional football player and manager, who played as a midfielder.

References

1950 births
Living people
German footballers
Association football midfielders
SV Meppen players
VfL Osnabrück players
German football managers
VfL Osnabrück managers
VfB Oldenburg managers
SV Wilhelmshaven managers
BV Cloppenburg managers
SV Meppen managers
2. Bundesliga managers